Major League Ultimate (MLU) was a North American semi-professional Ultimate league from 2013 to 2016. It was composed of eight member teams, seven in the United States and one in Canada. It was formed in 2012, and began its inaugural season in April 2013. The season concluded with championship games for the Western and Eastern divisions and a cross-divisional championship game.

History
The Philadelphia Spinners left the American Ultimate Disc League at the end of the 2012 season after disagreements on how it was run. With the help of their staff, including former GM Jeff Snader, and a core group of individuals now referred to as the Founders, the MLU was created in 2012. On December 21, 2016, the league announced that its investors had pulled funding and that league operations would be suspended indefinitely.

Rules
The MLU used most of the standard rules of Ultimate, with multiple adaptations. Most of the adaptations were like those of the American Ultimate Disc League, from which the MLU originated. Games were played on slightly expanded fields, and double-teaming of an offensive player was allowed. Also unusual for Ultimate, although common in other sports and the AUDL, the MLU used referees to make the calls. With time, more changes to the rules were applied by the MLU.

While most Ultimate games use the Ultrastar disc, the MLU used a slightly different disc, the Innova Pulsar, whose design made it stay in the air longer, leading to more hucks, deep games, and skys.

Although not an on-field rule, an early rule of the league was that all players would be compensated equally, at $25 a game. This eventually led some, like Beau Kittredge, to leave the league.

Competition format
The eight teams in the MLU were split into two conferences (East and West). During the regular season, each team played 10 matches (sometimes including cross-divisional matches). The top two teams from each division advanced to a conference final. The winners from these matches then advanced to compete in the MLU Championship match.

Media coverage
Highlights of the 2013 championship game were broadcast on Fox Sports 1 as part of an anthology show co-hosted by former NFL player Dhani Jones and Olympic gold medalist Jonny Moseley. ESPN's SportsCenter Top 10 and SportsNation have also featured highlight clips from the MLU, bringing national attention to the league.

In 2016, all games were livestreamed on YouTube and through the MLU website.

Sponsorship
In 2013, Five Ultimate was the official uniform manufacturer for all eight teams.

For the 2014 season, Puma became the official jersey sponsor.

For 2015 and 2016, Canterbury was the official jersey sponsor.

Teams

Championships

See also
  American Ultimate Disc League

References

 
Ultimate (sport) competitions
Professional sports leagues in the United States
2012 establishments in the United States
Sports leagues established in 2012
Sports leagues disestablished in 2016
Defunct professional sports leagues in the United States